Sašo Robič (5 May 1967 – 7 August 2010) was a Slovenian professional skier with limited success in the 1989 and 1990 seasons of the Alpine Skiing World Cup. He was a member, at later a coach, of the Yugoslav national skiing team.

He was related to Jure Robič who was his elder brother.

References

1967 births
2010 deaths
Slovenian male alpine skiers
Sportspeople from Jesenice, Jesenice